Atal Bihari Vajpayee was sworn in as Prime Minister of India for first time on 16 May 1996.

BJP was well short of majority and looking for allies, but Vajpayee resigned after just 16 days since he could not muster enough support. The ministry was kept small because its fate was uncertain when swearing-in took place.

List of Council members

References

External links 
http://parliamentofindia.nic.in/lsdeb/ls11/ses1/05230596.htm

Indian union ministries
Vajpayee administration
1996 establishments in India
Cabinets established in 1996
1996 disestablishments in India
Cabinets disestablished in 1996
Atal Bihari Vajpayee
Shiv Sena
Bharatiya Janata Party